The Anderson School PS 334 is a New York City school for children in grades kindergarten through 8 from the city's five boroughs.  It was founded  years ago (September 1987) as The Anderson Program under the stewardship of PS 9. The New York City Department of Education (DOE) spun off Anderson in July 2005 as a stand-alone school — PS 334.

Enrollment 
Anderson's enrollment for the 2018–19 school year was 535 students.  Since inception, Anderson has had two sections (classrooms) per grade.

School names 
The Anderson School (PS 334) inherited its name from its former parent school, the Sarah Anderson School, a K-5 neighborhood catchment school that offers two programs: Renaissance and Gifted and Talented.  Until PS 334 moved to 100 West 77th Street in July 2009, both schools shared a building at 100 West 84th Street.

Sarah Anderson (1922–1981) was a beloved school paraprofessional.  The school community petitioned the Board of Education to rename PS 9 in her honor.  It became official during her memorial dedication in May 1981.  Never married, she was the mother of three:  Clarence "Pete" Anderson (1938 and living in East New York, Brooklyn), Ronald ("Ronnie") Dean Anderson (b. 1939 Griffin GA – 2001 Griffin), and Thomas Anderson.  Sarah Anderson is buried at Mount Pleasant Baptist Church Cemetery, Griffin, GA.  Her nickname, for those close to her, was "Peggy."  Her daughter-in-law (Clarence's wife), Earnestine Anderson, also worked with Sarah as a paraprofessional at PS 9.  Earnestine resides in Griffin.

In 1993, under Principal Joan Gutkin, PhD (1936–1997), PS 9 (then the host school for The Anderson Program) received magnet school funding for music and art and henceforth adopted the name, "Renaissance School of Music and Art."  Ever since, PS 9 has used both names.

Physical plant 
 Sept 1987 – July 2009, Anderson shared a building with its founding parent school P.S. 9, The Sarah Anderson School, at 100 W 84th Street.
 July 2009 – Present, Anderson moved to a slightly older building six blocks due south at 100 W 77th Street, initially, sharing it with (i) The Computer School, (ii) JHS 44 O'Shea Middle School (a district middle school), and (iii) West Prep Academy (a district middle school).  At the start of the 2010–11 school year, PS 452, a new neighborhood elementary school (3 sections per grade), moved in the building.  July 2011 JHS 44 O'Shea Middle School was phased out and West Prep Academy moved to the P.S. 145 building at 150 West 105 Street. In July 2017, PS 452 moved to 210 West 61st street and the Dual Language Middle School moved in to the vacated space on the second floor of the O'Shea Complex.

See also 

 List of public elementary schools in New York City
 List of middle schools in New York City

References

External links

The Anderson School PS 334
 The Anderson School — The Anderson School official website
 Anderson Athletics official website
City and State Resources
 New York City Department of Education — official site
 University of the State of New York, State Education Department — official site
 NYC DOE Office of School Support Services — official site
 NYC School Construction Authority — official site
Teacher Certification
 Center for Gifted Studies & Education at Hunter College (Certification)
 NYS Part 80 Requirements for Gifted Ed Certification
 NYS Gifted Ed Extension Resource Site
 NYS Teacher Certification(TM), Gifted Ed Test Framework
Regional Education Advocacy
 insideschools.org | Advocates for Children of New York, Inc. (lookup schools)
National Associations
 Council for Exceptional Children
 National Association for Gifted Children — official site
 Davidson Institute
History
 History of Gifted Education in the U.S.
Journals
 Gifted Child Quarterly — National Association for Gifted Children
 Gifted Education International
 Exceptional Children — Council for Exceptional Children

Public elementary schools in Manhattan
Public middle schools in Manhattan
Educational institutions established in 1987
Gifted education
Magnet schools in New York (state)
1987 establishments in New York City